Gulzar Khanwala is a village of Dera Ghazi Khan District in the Punjab province of Pakistan.

References

Populated places in Dera Ghazi Khan District
Villages in Dera Ghazi Khan District